Tiina Nunnally (born August 7, 1952) is an American author and translator.

Early life and education
Nunnally was born in Chicago, Illinois, and grew up in Milwaukee, Wisconsin, and St. Louis Park, Minnesota. She was an AFS exchange student to Århus, Denmark in 1969 and 1970. She received an MA in 1976 from the University of Wisconsin-Madison and a PhC from the University of Washington in 1979. She has a long association with the Department of Scandinavian Studies at the University of Washington, but she is not a salaried faculty member.

Career
Nunnally is a translator of Danish, Norwegian, and Swedish, who sometimes uses the pseudonym Felicity David when edited into UK English. Her translation of Kristin Lavransdatter III: The Cross by Sigrid Undset won the PEN/Book-of-the-Month Club Translation Prize in 2001, and Peter Høeg's Smilla's Sense of Snow won the American Translators Association's Lewis Galantière Prize.

Her first novel, Maija, won a Governor's Writers Award from the State of Washington in 1996. Since then two more of her novels have been published.

The Swedish Academy honored Nunnally in 2009 with a special award for her contributions to "the introduction of Swedish culture abroad".

Personal life
Since 2002 she has lived in Albuquerque, New Mexico, with her husband Steven T. Murray, both full-time freelance literary translators.

Selected translations
 Niels Lyhne by Jens Peter Jacobsen (from Danish) (1990)
 Smilla's Sense of Snow [American title] by Peter Høeg (from Danish) (1993); [UK reprint title: Miss Smilla's Feeling for Snow under pseudonym F. David]
 Kristin Lavransdatter I: The Wreath by Sigrid Undset (from Norwegian) (1997)
 Kristin Lavransdatter II: The Wife by Sigrid Undset (from Norwegian) (1999)
 Kristin Lavransdatter III: The Cross by Sigrid Undset (from Norwegian) (2000)
 Don't Look Back by Karin Fossum (from Norwegian) under pseudonym Felicity David (2002)
 He Who Fears the Wolf by Karin Fossum (from Norwegian) under pseudonym Felicity David (2003)
 Fairy Tales by Hans Christian Andersen (from Danish) (2004)
 When the Devil Holds the Candle by Karin Fossum (from Norwegian) under pseudonym Felicity David (2004)
 Kristin Lavransdatter by Sigrid Undset, Deluxe Classics edition (from Norwegian) (2005)
 Chronicler of the Winds by Henning Mankell (from Swedish) (2006)
 Pippi Longstocking by Astrid Lindgren, a new translation, illustrated by Lauren Child (from Swedish) (2007)
 The Copenhagen Trilogy by Tove Ditlevsen (from Danish) (2019)

Honors and awards

 Award from the Swedish Academy for “the introduction of Swedish culture abroad” (2009)
 Independent Foreign Fiction Prize for The Royal Physician's Visit by Per Olov Enquist (2003)
 PEN/Book-of-the-Month Club Translation Prize, for Kristin Lavransdatter: The Cross by Sigrid Undset (2001)
 Washington Governor's Writers Award for her novel Maija (1996)
 Lewis Galantière Award from the American Translators Association for Smilla's Sense of Snow by Peter Høeg (1994)
 American-Scandinavian Foundation Translation Prize for Early Spring by Tove Ditlevsen (1984)

References

External links
 Affiliate Faculty page at the University of Washington
 Nunnally's prize from the Swedish Academy (in Swedish)

1952 births
Living people
Writers from Chicago
American people of Finnish descent
Danish–English translators
Swedish–English translators
Norwegian–English translators
Writers from Milwaukee
People from St. Louis Park, Minnesota
Novelists from Minnesota
American women novelists
20th-century American novelists
21st-century American novelists
20th-century American women writers
21st-century American women writers
20th-century translators
21st-century translators
Writers from Albuquerque, New Mexico
University of Wisconsin–Madison alumni
Novelists from Illinois
Novelists from Wisconsin